Sharon Winona Davids is a South African politician who served as a Member of the Western Cape Provincial Parliament for the African National Congress from May 2014 until May 2019. Davids was previously a councillor of the Drakenstein Local Municipality.

Political career
Davids is a member of the African National Congress. During her tenure as a councillor in the Drakenstein Local Municipality, she was a portfolio member on infrastructure.

Davids was nominated to the Western Cape Provincial Parliament following the general election that was held on 7 May 2014, as she was placed 5th on the ANC's list and the party won 14 seats. She was sworn in as an MPP on 21 May 2014.

Davids was not placed on ANC's provincial list for the 2019 provincial election and left the provincial parliament on 7 May 2019.

References

Living people
Year of birth missing (living people)
Members of the Western Cape Provincial Parliament
African National Congress politicians
21st-century South African politicians
21st-century South African women politicians
People from Drakenstein Local Municipality
Coloured South African people
Women members of provincial legislatures of South Africa